Tony Fennelly (born November 25, 1945) is an American writer of mystery fiction.

Life and career
A native of Orange, New Jersey, Fennelly graduated from the University of New Orleans after working variously as a bartender, topless dancer, and stripper; she then went to work for the Department of Welfare, which provided material for some of her work. Her novels, which feature gay furniture store owner and former lawyer Matthew "Matty" Sinclair, are set in New Orleans. Her first novel, The Glory Hole Murders, was nominated for an Edgar Award; it has found more popularity in Europe than in the United States, as have her other works. Other novels feature columnist Margo Fortier, formerly a stripper, as their heroine.

Works

Matty Sinclair novels
The Glory Hole Murders (1985)
The Closet Hanging (1987)
Kiss Yourself Goodbye (1989)

Margo Fortier novels
The Hippie in the Wall (1994)
1-900-Dead (1997)
Don't Blame the Snake (2000)

Non-series
Cherry (1993)

References

1945 births
Living people
American women novelists
American mystery novelists
Women mystery writers
20th-century American novelists
20th-century American women writers
People from Orange, New Jersey
Writers from New Orleans
Novelists from New Jersey
Novelists from Louisiana
University of New Orleans alumni
21st-century American women